The Africa Monetary Fund is a planned African Union financial institution, though in time its responsibilities will be transferred to the African Central Bank. This institution is one of the three financial institutions of the future African Union. It will be based in Yaoundé, Cameroon.

Proposed shareholding
The bank envisages to have a paid up capital of $23 billion.

References

External links
 Draft Statute of the African Monetary Fund
AU discussions on African Monetary Fund

Organs of the African Union
Banks of the African Union